Paschal Beverly Randolph (October 8, 1825 – July 29, 1875) was an American medical doctor, occultist, spiritualist, trance medium, and writer. He is notable as perhaps the first person to introduce the principles of erotic alchemy to North America, and, according to A. E. Waite, establishing the earliest known Rosicrucian order in the United States.

Early life 
Born in New York City, Randolph grew up in New York City and was baptized at the Church of the Transfiguration, Episcopal (Manhattan). He was a free black man, a descendant of William Randolph. His father was a nephew of John Randolph of Roanoke and his mother was Flora Beverly, whom he later described as being of mixed English, French, German, Native American and African ancestry. His mother died when he was young, leaving him homeless and penniless; he ran away to sea in order to support himself. From his adolescence through to the age of twenty, he worked as a sailor.

As a teen and young man, Randolph traveled widely, due to his work aboard sailing vessels. He journeyed to England, through Europe, and as far east as Persia, where his interest in mysticism and the occult led him to study with local practitioners of folk magic and various religions. On these travels he also met and befriended occultists in England and Paris, France.

Career 
Returning to New York City in September 1855, after "a long tour in Europe and Africa," he gave a public lecture to African Americans on the subject of emigrating to India. Randolph believed that "the Negro is destined to extinction" in the United States.

After leaving the sea, Randolph embarked upon a public career as a lecturer and writer. By his mid-twenties, he regularly appeared on stage as a trance medium and advertised his services as a spiritual practitioner in magazines associated with Spiritualism. Like many Spiritualists of his era, he lectured in favor of the abolition of slavery; after emancipation, he taught literacy to freed slaves in New Orleans.

In addition to his work as a trance medium, Randolph trained as a doctor of medicine and wrote and published both fictional and instructive books based on his theories of health, sexuality, Spiritualism and occultism. He wrote more than fifty works on magic and medicine, established an independent publishing company, and was an avid promoter of birth control during a time when it was largely against the law to mention this topic.

Having long used the pseudonym "The Rosicrucian" for his Spiritualist and occult writings, Randolph eventually founded the Fraternitas Rosae Crucis in 1858, and their first lodge in San Francisco in 1861, the oldest Rosicrucian organization in the United States. This group, still in existence, today avoids mention of Randolph's interest in sex magic, but his magico-sexual theories and techniques formed the basis of much of the teachings of another occult fraternity, the Hermetic Brotherhood of Luxor, although it is not clear that Randolph himself was ever personally associated with the Brotherhood.

Belief and teaching 
Randolph described himself as a Rosicrucian. He had worked "largely alone", producing "his own synthesis" of "esoteric teachings".

Sex and gender 

The manner in which Randolph incorporated sex into his occult system was considered uncharacteristically bold for the period in which he lived. He believed that sex magic could lead to increased health, love, the empowerment of women, and children of superior intelligence. In his more underground publications, he wrote that church and marriage were oppressive forces that could be overthrown with the power of love in a world-wide revolution.

Randolph held an unusually expansive view of gender identity, considering earthly gender to be "provisional," and referring to God as both male and female. In a book on love he wrote:
I believe in love, all the way through. And while I live will help every man, woman, and the betweenities to win, obtain, intensify, deepen, purify, strengthen and keep it, and I will help all others to do the same. There! That’s me! I mean it!

In the spirit world that Randolph wrote of in elaborate detail, human bodies are filled with electric current instead of blood and saliva. People move by magnetism. They have art, schools, and cities as terrestrial humans do, but their lives are more enjoyable and sex is better. Spirit-world marriages "last just so long as the parties thereto are agreeably and mutually pleased with, and attracted, to each other, and no longer"

Pre-Adamism 
Randolph was a believer in pre-Adamism (the belief that humans existed on earth before the biblical Adam) and wrote the book Pre-Adamite Man: demonstrating the existence of the human race upon the earth 100,000 thousand years ago! under the name of Griffin Lee in 1863. His book was a unique contribution towards pre-Adamism because it wasn't strictly based on biblical grounds. Randolph used a wide range of sources to write his book from many different world traditions, esoterica and ancient religions. Randolph traveled to many countries of the world where he wrote different parts of his book. In the book he claims that Adam was not the first man and that pre-Adamite men existed on all continents around the globe 35,000 years to 100,000 years ago. His book was different from many of the other writings from other pre-Adamite authors because in Randolph's book he claims the pre-Adamites were civilized men while other pre-Adamite authors argued that the pre-Adamites were beasts or hominids.

Personal life 
A peripatetic man, he lived in many places, including New York State, New Orleans, San Francisco, and Toledo, Ohio. He married his first wife, Mary Jane, in 1850; she was African (or possibly mixed-race). Together, they had three children, only one of whom (Cora, born 1854) survived to adulthood. They owned a farm in Stockbridge, New York during the 1850s, but sold it in April 1860 for one dollar. They later lived in Utica, New York, where Mary Jane worked as "a healer and dispenser of Native american remedies," in addition to helping Paschal publish and sell several books. They divorced in January 1864.

Later in life he married his second wife, Kate Corson, an Irish-American woman, with whom he had one child, Osiris Budh (or Buddha) Randolph (1874–1929). Corson acted as a medium and a seer in collaboration with Randolph, and published several of his books, but their relationship appears to have been conflicted for its duration. He is reported to have discovered that she was having an affair shortly before his apparent death by suicide in 1875. After his death, Corson Randolph continued publishing his works under the Randolph Publishing Company imprint until the early 1900s.

Death 
Randolph died in Toledo, Ohio, at the age of 49, under disputed circumstances. According to biographer Carl Edwin Lindgren, many questioned the newspaper article "By His Own Hand" that appeared in The Toledo Daily Blade. According to this article, Randolph had died from a self-inflicted wound to the head. However, many of his writings express his aversion to suicide. R. Swinburne Clymer, a later Supreme Master of the Fraternitas, stated that years after Randolph's demise, in a death-bed confession, a former friend of Randolph had conceded that in a state of jealousy and temporary insanity, he had killed Randolph. Lucus County Probate Court records list the death as accidental. Randolph was succeeded as Supreme Grand Master of the Fraternitas, and in other titles, by his chosen successor Freeman B. Dowd.

Influence and legacy 
Randolph influenced both the Theosophical Society and—to a greater degree—the Hermetic Brotherhood of Luxor.

In 1994, the historian Joscelyn Godwin noted that Randolph had been largely neglected by historians of esotericism. In 1996, a biography was published, Paschal Beverly Randolph: A Nineteenth-Century Black American Spiritualist, Rosicrucian, and Sex Magician by John Patrick Deveney and Franklin Rosemont.

Published works 

Randolph also edited the Leader (Boston) and the Messenger of Light (New York) between 1852 and 1861 and wrote for the Journal of Progress and Spiritual Telegraph .

It is also attributed to Randolph "Affectional Alchemy and How It Works" (c. 1870).

1 under the pseudonym "Griffin Lee".
2 as anonymous.
3 under the pseudonym "Count de St. Leon".

References

Bibliography 
 Deveney, John Patrick and Franklin Rosemont (1996). Paschal Beverly Randolph: A Nineteenth-Century Black American Spiritualist, Rosicrucian, and Sex Magician. State University of New York Press. .
 Godwin, Jocelyn, Christian Chanel, and John Patrick Deveney (1995). The Hermetic Brotherhood of Luxor: Initiatic and Historical Documents of an Order of Practical Occultism. Samuel Weiser. .
 Carl Edwin Lindgren (1996). "The Rose Cross in America." Spiritual Alchemists. New Orleans: Ars Latomorum Publications, pp. 27–32. Available online.
 Carl Edwin Lindgren, (1999). "Randolph, Paschal Beverly." American National Biography (biographical entry).
 Randolph, Paschal Beverly (1932). SOUL, The Soul World. Beverly Hall, Quakertown, PA: The Confederation of Initiates.
 "By His Own Hand." The Toledo Daily Blade, July 29, 1875, p. 3, col 3. This article states that he committed suicide.
 Paschal Beverly Randolph. Lucas County Probate Court Death Records 1:254, Randolph entry, Lucus County Probate Court, Toledo.

External links 

 Biography at soul.org
 
 
 Carl Edwin Lindgren (1997). The History of the Rose Cross Order, Chapter III ("The Rose Cross In America, 1800–1909").

1825 births
1875 deaths
19th-century African-American writers
African-American physicians
19th-century American physicians
American occult writers
American people of English descent
American people of French descent
American people of German descent
American people of Malagasy descent
American people of Native American descent
19th-century American historians
P
Rosicrucians
19th-century occultists
Suicides in Ohio